Too Late to Cry is the debut Rounder album by American violinist/singer Alison Krauss, released in 1987.

Track listing
All songs by John Pennell unless otherwise noted.
 "Too Late to Cry" – 2:51
 "Foolish Heart" – 3:27
 "Song for Life" (Rodney Crowell) – 2:54
 "Dusty Miller" (Traditional) – 3:40
 "If I Give My Heart" – 4:05
 "In Your Eyes" – 3:15
 "Don't Follow Me" – 2:44
 "Gentle River" (Todd Rakestraw) – 4:26
 "On the Borderline" – 3:40
 "Forgotten Pictures" (Tony Trischka) – 2:22
 "Sleep On" (Nelson Mandrell) – 2:23

Personnel
 Alison Krauss – fiddle, vocals
 Russ Barenberg – acoustic guitar
 Sam Bush – mandolin
 John Cowan – vocals
 Dave Denman – vocals
 Jerry Douglas – Dobro
 Roy Huskey Jr. – upright bass
 Lonnie Meeker – acoustic guitar, vocals
 John Schmaltz – banjo
 Tony Trischka – banjo

References

1987 albums
Alison Krauss & Union Station albums
Rounder Records albums